Shelbyville is an unincorporated community in Shelby County, Texas, United States. It is located seven miles southeast of Center on State Highway 87. Close to Toledo Bend reservoir. 

The Shelbyville Independent School District serves area students.

Historical development

The town was founded in the 1820s with settlers from the Nashville, Tennessee, region. The town was originally called Nashville, but it was renamed Shelbyville in 1837 to honor the American Revolution hero and Kentucky Governor Isaac Shelby. The post office was later opened in 1843.

Shelbyville became the flash-point in the Regulator-Moderator War. Most of its major battles were fought in the town or nearby. A Republic of Texas post office had been established by 1843. In 1866 in a contested fight for the county seat, county records were spirited away in the dead of night and Center became the new Shelby County seat of government.

The population of Shelbyville in 1884 was 150, which doubled by 1914. It reached a peak in 1929 with an estimated population of 600 but declined by half during the Great Depression. It slowly increased, reaching 550 residents in the late 1940s but fell again—reaching 215 by the late 1980s—the same number given for the 2000 census.

Media
The Light and Champion, a news and information company, marked its 140th year of operation in 2017. It serves Shelby County, as well as Logansport, Louisiana. The Light and Champion produces a weekly print edition, a weekly free-distribution print product called The Merchandiser, operates a web site, www.lightandchampion.com, and a Facebook page. The Light and Champion is owned by Moser Community Media, based in Brenham, Texas.

References

External links
 

Unincorporated communities in Shelby County, Texas
Unincorporated communities in Texas